Keith Kuhlmann (born 15 December 1955) is a former Australian rules footballer who played for West Adelaide and Glenelg in the SANFL. 

A key position defender, Kuhlmann started his career in 1973 at West Adelaide and was a regular member of their team during the 1970s. Such was his consistency that he was never dropped to the West Adelaide reserves. He crossed to Glenelg in 1979 and played well enough to be selected to the South Australian interstate team four times. His interstate performances in 1980, at fullback, saw him named in the All-Australian team.
Known for his booming kicks out of Full Back often reaching or clearing the centre circle at many grounds.

External links

1955 births
Living people
Australian rules footballers from South Australia
West Adelaide Football Club players
Glenelg Football Club players
South Australian State of Origin players
All-Australians (1953–1988)